The 2018 Girls' Youth European Volleyball Championship was the thirteenth edition of the Girls' Youth European Volleyball Championship, a biennial international volleyball tournament organised by the European Volleyball Confederation (CEV) the girls' under-17 national teams of Europe. The tournament was held in Bulgaria from 13 to 21 April 2018.

A total of twelve teams played in the tournament, with players born on or after 1 January 2001 eligible to participate. 

Same as previous editions, the tournament acted as the CEV qualifiers for the FIVB Volleyball Girls' U18 World Championship. The top six teams qualified for the 2019 FIVB Volleyball Girls' U18 World Championship as the CEV representatives.

Participating teams
 Hosts
 
 Qualified through 2018 Girls' U17 Volleyball European Championship Qualification

Pools composition

Preliminary round

Pool I

|}

|}

Pool II

|}

|}

5th–8th classification

5th–8th Semifinals

|}

7th place match

|}

5th place match

|}

Final round

Semifinals

|}

3rd place match

|}

Final

|}

Final standing

Awards
At the conclusion of the tournament, the following players were selected as the tournament dream team.

Most Valuable Player
  Valeriia Gorbunova
Best Setter
  Polina Matveeva
Best Outside Spikers
  Aleksandra Georgieva
  Loveth Omoruyi

Best Middle Blockers
  Elizaveta Kochurina
  Claudia Consoli
Best Opposite Spiker
  Sude Hacımustafaoğlu
Best Libero
  Gülce Güçtekin

References

External links
Official website

Girls' Youth European Volleyball Championship
Europe
Volleyball
2018 in Bulgarian women's sport
International volleyball competitions hosted by Bulgaria
Volleyball European Championship (girls)
Sports competitions in Sofia